is a Japanese basketball player. She competed in the women's tournament at the 1976 Summer Olympics.

References

1953 births
Living people
Japanese women's basketball players
Olympic basketball players of Japan
Basketball players at the 1976 Summer Olympics
Sportspeople from Fukuoka (city)
20th-century Japanese women